is a Japanese actor and stuntman who is mostly known for playing Godzilla for the "Millennium" (or "Shinsei") series. He also played King Ghidorah for Rebirth of Mothra III. He also played the costumed actor for the Blue (and occasionally, Black) Ranger in many of Toei Company's Super Sentai Series in the 1980s, better known in the United States as Power Rangers. Kitagawa graduated from Sakuragaoka High School before joining Sonny Chiba's Japan Action Club in January 1975.

Filmography

Suit actor
 Battle Fever J (1979) - Battle Kenya, Miss America 2
 Denshi Sentai Denziman (1980-1981) - Denzi Blue
 Dai Sentai Goggle-V (1982-1983) - Goggle Black
 Kagaku Sentai Dynaman (1983-1984) - Dyna yellow
 Choudenshi Bioman (1984-1985) - Blue Three
 Dengeki Sentai Changeman (1985-1986) - Change Pegasus
 Choushinsei Flashman (1986-1987) - Blue Flash
 Hikari Sentai Maskman (1987-1988) - Blue Mask
 Sekai Ninja Sen Jiraiya (1988-1989) - Chinese Ninja Lu-Long
 Gosei Sentai Dairanger (1993-1994) - Shishi Ranger
 Ninja Sentai Kakuranger (1994-1995) - Ninja Black
 Juken Sentai Gekiranger (2007-2008) - Master Bat li
 Ressha Sentai ToQger vs. Kyoryuger: The Movie - ToQ 2gou (child version)
 Ressha Sentai ToQger Returns: Super ToQ 7gou of Dreams -  ToQ 2gou (child version)

Chouseishin series
 Chouseishin Gransazer (2003-2004) - Sazer Remls

Other roles
 Rebirth of Mothra III (1998) as Grand King Ghidorah
 Godzilla 2000 (1999) as Godzilla
 Godzilla vs. Megaguirus (2000) as Godzilla
 Godzilla Against Mechagodzilla (2002) as Godzilla
 Godzilla: Tokyo SOS (2003) as Godzilla
 Godzilla: Final Wars (2004) as Godzilla
 Bringing Godzilla Down to Size: The Art of Japanese Special Effects (2008) as himself

Non-Suit Roles
Taiyo Sentai Sun Vulcan (1981) -   Worker
Dai Sentai Goggle-V (1982) - Kung-Fu Doll, Motorcycle Gang member
Dengeki Sentai Changeman (1985) -  Saga
Choujin Sentai Jetman (1991) - Man
Juken Sentai Gekiranger (2007) - Cake Vendor
Kamen Rider Wizard (2013) - Guard 
Ressha Sentai ToQger (2014) - Guard
Kikai Sentai Zenkaiger (2021) - Mr. Su

References

1957 births
Japanese male film actors
Living people
Actors from Yamaguchi Prefecture